Panguitch Lake was originally a large natural lake (777 acres) that has now been expanded by the creation of a  dam to become a reservoir with a maximum surface area of . The lake, which drains into the Sevier River is located on the Markagunt Plateau, between Panguitch, Utah and Cedar Breaks National Monument. The lake is located in the Dixie National Forest in a high tourist use area near three national parks and one national monument.

Panguitch Lake contains several campgrounds.  Convenience stores and a Latter-day Saint chapel are within walking distance of the campgrounds, and the roads are well paved and maintained. Road access to the lake is provided by Utah State Route 143, also known as the Brian Head-Panguitch Lake Scenic Byway or Utah's Patchwork Parkway.

The earliest known use of Panguitch Lake was as a fishery by Paiute Indians (Panguitch means "big fish" in the Paiute language). Panguitch Lake was treated with rotenone beginning May 1, 2006 to potentially eradicate and control the invasive population of Utah chub, which were probably introduced accidentally by anglers who used them as live bait. The lake was restocked with 20,000 rainbow trout in 2006; as of 2016, the lake's fish population has recovered.

External links 

 Panguitch Lake at the Utah Division of Wildlife Resources
 Panguitch Lake at GO-UTAH.com
    by the Utah Division of Water Quality
 Bryce Canyon Country - Panguitch Lake

Reservoirs in Utah
Lakes of the Great Basin
Lakes of Garfield County, Utah
Buildings and structures in Garfield County, Utah
Tourist attractions in Garfield County, Utah
Dixie National Forest